Holy God is the fourth major album and first studio album by Brian Doerksen released on the Integrity Music label. It was released on March 6, 2007. In 2008, the album was honored as "Contemporary Christian/Gospel Album" of the year by the JUNO Awards.

Track listing
"Invocation"  - 0:36
"Our Father In Heaven"  - 5:21
"Holy God"  - 6:51
"Return To Me" - 1:07
"Song For The Bride" - 3:23
"He Is Here"  - 4:07
"Light the Fire Again"  - 5:55
"Hear Us Call"  - 5:39
"I Don't Need Anything But You"  - 3:56
"Change Me On The Inside"  - 4:23
"Show Me Your Way"  - 2:32
"Trinity"  - 2:42
"Be Unto Your Name/ Holy Holy Holy"  - 5:29
"Triune God"  - 5:53
"You Are My Home"  - 4:41
"Your Love Will Find Me"  - 4:08

Track Performers and Writers

Holy God lists the following song writing credits:

Notes

Brian Doerksen albums
2007 albums
Juno Award for Contemporary Christian/Gospel Album of the Year albums